The following is a list of triple albums, in which the initial release of the album includes three LP records or compact discs.

A
 The Allman Brothers Band - Jones Beach, Wantagh, NY 8/24/04
The Allman Brothers Band – Chronicles: 3 Classic Albums (2005) - compilation
 Alan Silva and The Celestrial Communication Orchestra- Seasons - (3×LP, 2×CD)
 Alquin - The Ultimate Collection (2007) - 3×CD compilation
 America - Highway - 30 years of America (2000)
 America - The Triple Album Collection (2015)
 Armand - Singles A's & B's (2003)

B
 The Band – The Last Waltz (1978)
 BAP - Niedeckens: die beliebtesten Lieder 1976-2016 (2016) 
 Syd Barrett – Crazy Diamond – compilation
 The Beatles – Anthology 1 3xLP, 2xCD
 The Beatles – Anthology 2 3xLP, 2xCD
 The Beatles – Anthology 3 3xLP, 2xCD
 The Beatles – Live at the BBC Volume 1 3xLP, 2xCD
 The Beatles – On Air – Live at the BBC Volume 2 3xLP, 2xCD
 Carla Bley – Escalator over the Hill (1971)
 Blue Floyd – Keswick Thr., Glenside, Pa, 1-21-2000 (2010) - live
 Blu & Exile - Miles (2020) 3xLP
 Boards of Canada – Geogaddi (2002)
 Bonzo Dog Doo-Dah Band – Cornology (1992)
 Boris with Merzbow – Rock Dream 3xLP, 2xCD
 Billy Bragg – Must I Paint You A Picture? The Essential Billy Bragg (2003) – compilation
 Brainbox – Mythology (2013)
 Zach Bryan - American Heartbreak (2022)

C
 John Cage – The 25-Year Retrospective Concert of the Music of John Cage (1994)
 Chamillionaire - Mixtape Messiah
 The Clash - Clash on Broadway (1991)
 The Clash - Sandinista! (1980) – 3×LP, 2xCD
 Coil - ANS
 John Coltrane - "Coltrane In Japan"
 John Coltrane - "Second Night In Tokyo"
 Creed - With Arms Wide Open: A Retrospective (2015)

D
 Miles Davis, Jack DeJohnette, Dave Holland, Chick Corea & Wayne Shorter - Live in Europe 1969: The Bootleg Series, Vol.2 
 Miles Davis Quintet - Live in Europe 1967: The Bootleg Series, Vol.1
 Anthony de Mare – Liaisons: Re-Imagining Sondheim from the Piano (2015), 3×CD
 Sasha & John Digweed - Renaissance: The Mix Collection
 The-Dream  - Ménage à Trois: Sextape Vol. 1, 2, 3 (2018)   - 3xCD -  studio
 Dream Theater - Live Scenes from New York (2001)
 Dream Theater - Live at Budokan (2004)
 Dream Theater - Score (2006)
 Deep Purple - Live in Japan
 Deep Purple - The Platinum Collection (2005)
 Nick Drake - Fruit Tree : Five Leaves Left; Bryter Layter; Pink Moon; A Skin Too Few + DVD (2007) - 3×CD reissue
 Bob Dylan - Triplicate (2017)

E
 The Early November - The Mother, the Mechanic, and the Path (2006)
 Electric Light Orchestra – Flashback (2000) - 3×CD – compilation
 Emerson, Lake & Palmer - Welcome Back My Friends to the Show That Never Ends (1974)
 Brian Eno - Instrumental 
 Brian Eno - Vocal

F
 Faust - Faust... in autumn 2005 [+ bonus DVD] (2007) 
 Léo Ferré - Ludwig - L'Imaginaire - Le Bateau ivre
Léo Ferré – Léo Ferré au Théâtre des Champs-Elysées (1984) – 3×LP (live)
Flairck - 3 Originals (1998) 
 Masaharu Fukuyama - The Best Bang!! (2010)

G
 Gandalf's Fist - The Clockwork Fable (2016)
 Marvin Gaye - Anthology (1974) – 3×LP, 2xCD
 Vince Gill – These Days (2006) - 4×CD
 Godley & Creme – Consequences (1977) – 3×LP (debut album)
 Golden Earring - Fully Naked - live compilation
 Golden Earring - Collected - compilation
 Grateful Dead - Dick's Picks Volume 4 (1996)
 Grateful Dead - Dick's Picks Volume 5 (1996)
 Grateful Dead - Dick's Picks Volume 6 (1996)
 Grateful Dead - Dick's Picks Volume 7 (1997)
 Grateful Dead - Dick's Picks Volume 8 (1997)
 Grateful Dead - Dick's Picks Volume 9 (1997)
 Grateful Dead - Dick's Picks Volume 10 (1998)
 Grateful Dead - Dick's Picks Volume 11 (1998)
 Grateful Dead - Dick's Picks Volume 12 (1998)
 Grateful Dead - Dick's Picks Volume 13 (1999)
 Grateful Dead - Dick's Picks Volume 14 (1999)
 Grateful Dead - Dick's Picks Volume 15 (1999)
 Grateful Dead - Dick's Picks Volume 16 (2000)
 Grateful Dead - Dick's Picks Volume 17 (2000)
 Grateful Dead - Dick's Picks Volume 18 (2000)
 Grateful Dead - Dick's Picks Volume 19 (2000)
 Grateful Dead - Dick's Picks Volume 21 (2001)
 Grateful Dead - Dick's Picks Volume 23 (2001)
 Grateful Dead - Dick's Picks Volume 27 (2003)
 Grateful Dead - Dick's Picks Volume 34 (2005)
 Grateful Dead - Europe '72 (1972)
 Grateful Dead - Rockin' the Rhein with the Grateful Dead (2004)
Greg Barnett - The Flat White Album (2020) 
 The Groundhogs - Thank Christ for the Groundhogs: the Liberty years 1968-1972 
 The Groundhogs - The United Artists years: 1972-1976

H
 Half Japanese - 1/2 Gentlemen/Not Beasts (1980)
 Masashi Hamauzu - SaGa Frontier 2 Original Soundtrack
 George Harrison - All Things Must Pass (1970)

I
 Kenji Ito - SaGa Frontier Original Sound Track
 Iron Maiden - The Book of Souls (2015) - 3×LP, 2×CD
 Iron Maiden - Senjutsu (2021) - 3×LP, 2×CD

J
 Michael Jackson - HIStory: Past, Present and Future, Book I (1995) - compilation and studio album; 3 x LP, 2 x CD
 Jackson 5 - Anthology (1976)
 Keith Jarrett - Setting Standards: New York Sessions (2008) - compilation

K
 Hiroki Kikuta - Seiken Densetsu 3 Original Sound Version
 King Crimson - Heavy Construkction (2001) 
 King Crimson - Radical Action to Unseat the Hold of Monkey Mind (2016)
 Kluster - Kluster 1970-1971 (2008) - compilation reissue
 The Knife - Shaking the Habitual (2012) - 3×LP, 2×CD

L
 Led Zeppelin - How the West Was Won (2003)
 Livin' Blues - The Complete Collection: the Philips years 1967-1973
 Lucio Battisti - Le avventure di Lucio Battisti e Mogol

M
 MC5 - Are You Ready To Testify?
 Madness – The Liberty of Norton Folgate (2009) – 3×CD, 1×LP (special edition box set)
 Paul McCartney - Tripping the Live Fantastic (1990)
 Reba McEntire – 50 Greatest Hits (2008)
 Magma - Trilogy: Magma live; Üdü Wüdü; Attahk (2012)
 The Magnetic Fields - 69 Love Songs (1999)
 MF Grimm - American Hunger (2006)
 Yasunori Mitsuda - Chrono Cross Original Soundtrack
 Yasunori Mitsuda, et al. - Chrono Trigger Original Sound Version
 Metallica - Garage Inc. (1998) – 3xLP, 2xCD
 Metallica - Live Shit: Binge and Purge  – 3×CD, 2×DVD
 Elliott Murphy - Strings of the Storm
 Mersiless Amìr - True Legend (2022) – 3×CD
 Madonna - Finally Enough Love: 50 Number Ones (2022) – 3×CD, 6×LP

N
 Joanna Newsom - Have One On Me (2010)
 Niagara - Niagara - 3×CD re-issue
 Stevie Nicks - Enchanted (1998)
 Nirvana - Chemistry
 Nirvana - With the Lights Out (2004)
 The Nitty Gritty Dirt Band - Will the circle be unbroken? (1972)

O
 Mike Oldfield - Boxed (1976) - 4×LP, 3×CD - compilation
 Oneida - Rated O (2009)

P
 Pearl Jam - 11/6/00 - Seattle, Washington (2001)
 Pearl Jam - 5/3/03 - State College, Pennsylvania (2003)
 Pearl Jam - 7/11/03 - Mansfield, Massachusetts (2003)
 Pearl Jam - 7/8/03 - New York, New York (2003)
 Joel Plaskett - Three (2009)
 Premiata Forneria Marconi - Cook 
 PORN - Mr Strangler Trilogy 
 Prince - Crystal Ball (1998)
 Prince - Emancipation (1996) - 3×CD
 Prince - The Hits/The B-Sides (1993) - 3×CD
 Prince - LOtUSFLOW3R (2009)
 Prurient - Rainbow Mirror (2017)
 Public Image Ltd. - Metal Box (1979)

Q

 Queen - The Platinum Collection (2000)

R
 Rae Sremmurd - SR3MM (2018)
 Rare Earth - Fill Your Head: The Studio Albums 1969-1974
 Cliff Richard - The Platinum Collection (2005)
 The Rolling Stones - Singles Collection: The London Years (1989)
 Steve Roach - Immersion: Three (2007)
 Rush - Archives (1978) – 3×LP
 Rush – Different Stages (1998)
 Rush – Rush in Rio (2003)
 Leon Russell - Leon Live

S
 Santana - Lotus (1991)
 The Seeds - Flower Punk 
 Frank Sinatra - Trilogy: Past Present Future (1980)
 The Smashing Pumpkins – Mellon Collie and the Infinite Sadness (1995) – 3×LP
 Ringo Starr - The Anthology... So Far (2001)
 Simon & Garfunkel - Collected Works (1981)
 Simon & Garfunkel - Old Friends (1997)
 Bob Smith - Stop For A Visit Down Electric Avenue (2000) - 3×CD reissue compilation 
 Soft Machine – Live at Henie Onstad Art Centre 1971 (+ bonus cd)
 Soft Machine – Triple Echo (1977) - 3×LP compilation
 Spinvis - 2002 - 2007 (2007)
 Swallow The Sun - Songs from the North I, II & III (2015)
 Swans - The Seer (2012) - 3xLP
 Swans - To Be Kind (2014) - 3xLP
 Swans - The Glowing Man (2016) - 3xLP

T
Taylor Swift - Fearless (Taylor's Version) (2021)
The Tangent - Pyramids, Stars & More Live Recordings 2004-2017 (2022)
Tina Turner - The Collected Recordings – Sixties to Nineties (1994)
Tina Turner - The Platinum Collection
Transatlantic - Whirld Tour 2010: Live in London (2010) 
Transatlantic - More Never Is Enough: Live In Manchester & Tilburg 2010 (2011)

U
 Nobuo Uematsu - Final Fantasy VI Original Soundtrack
 Underworld - 1992-2012 The Anthology (2011)

V
 Various artists - Woodstock: Music from the Original Soundtrack and More (1970) – 3×LP, 2×CD
 Various artists - Concert for Bangladesh (1971) - 3×LP, 2×CD
 Various artists - The First Great Rock Festivals Of The Seventies - Isle of Wight / Atlanta Pop Festival (1971) – 3×LP
 Various artists - Glastonbury Fayre (1972) - 3×LP
 Various artists - No Nukes (1980) - 3×LP
 Various artists - OHM : The early gurus of electronic music 1948 - 1980 (2000) - 3×CD
 Various artists - Ars long vita brevis: progressive rock 1967-1974 (2005) 
 Various artists - Too Young Hits of the '50s (2005) 
 Various artists - The Blue Horizon story; vol.1 : 1965-1970 (2006) - 3×CD
 Various artists - Greasy Truckers Party (2007) - 3×CD reissue 
 Various artists - Stamping Ground: Kralinger Music Festival 26-27–28 June 1970 Rotterdam Holland (2010) - 3×LP
 Various artists - The Music of Grand Theft Auto V (2014)  - 6xLP, 3xCD
 Various artists - Westworld - 3×LP
 The Violet Burning - The Story Of Our Lives

W
 Tom Waits - Orphans: Brawlers, Bawlers & Bastards (2006)
Kamasi Washington - The Epic (album) (2015)
Kanye West - My Beautiful Dark Twisted Fantasy (2010) - 3xLP
 Wings - Wings over America (1976)
 Stevie Wonder - Looking Back - Anthology (1977)
 World Wrestling Entertainment - WWE Anthology (2002)
 The Weeknd - Trilogy (2012)
 Whitey - GREAT SHAKES 1 & 2
 The Who - Join Together (1990) - 3xLP

X

Y
 Yes - Yessongs (1973) - 3×LP, 2×CD
 Neil Young - Decade (1977) - 3×LP, 2×CD
 Neil Young & Crazy Horse - ARC - Weld

Z
 Frank Zappa - Joe's Garage (1979)
 Frank Zappa - Shut Up 'n Play Yer Guitar (1981) - 3×CD
 Frank Zappa - Läther (1996) - 3×CD
 Frank Zappa - Thing-Fish (1984)
 Zoviet France - Popular Soviet Songs and Youth Music (1985) - 3×CD

Various artists
 Hits 60
 Now That's What I Call Music! Years (2004)
 Now That's What I Call Music! Decades - The Deluxe Edition (2003)
 Now That's What I Call the 80's (2007) - 3×CD

See also
 List of double albums
 Lists of albums

References

Triple albums, List of